Orecta venedictoffae is a species of moth of the  family Sphingidae. It is known from Ecuador and Costa Rica.

Adults have been recorded in mid June and early July in Costa Rica.

References

Ambulycini
Moths described in 1995